HMAS LST 3008 was a landing ship tank which was briefly operated by the Royal Navy and Royal Australian Navy (RAN). She was built at Harland and Wolff in Belfast during World War II and was launched on 31 October 1944. She served with the Royal Navy as HMS LST 3008 until 1 July 1946 when she was transferred to the RAN. She was used as a transport in RAN service until 1948 when she was placed in reserve. HMAS LST 3008 was sold for scrap on 4 June 1950 and was scrapped in Sydney in the 1950s.

References
 
 

 

1944 ships
LST (3)-class tank landing ships of the Royal Australian Navy
Ships built in Belfast
Ships built by Harland and Wolff